The 2013 NCAA Rifle Championships were contested at the 34th annual NCAA-sanctioned competition to determine the team and individual national champions of co-ed collegiate rifle shooting in the United States. 

The championship was again hosted by Ohio State University at the Lt. Hugh W. Wylie Range in Columbus, Ohio.

West Virginia won the team championship, the Mountaineers' fifteenth NCAA national title in rifle and first since 2009.

Additionally, West Virginia's Petra Zublasing became the fourth person to win both individual championships, smallbore and air rifle, in the same year and the first since Matthew Emmons in 2001.

Qualification
With only one national collegiate championship for rifle shooting, all NCAA rifle programs (whether from Division I, Division II, or Division III) were eligible. A total of eight teams contested this championship.

Results
Scoring:  The championship consisted of 60 shots for both smallbore and air rifle per team.

Team title
(DC) = Defending champions
Italics = Inaugural championship
† = Team won center shot tiebreaker

Individual events

References

NCAA Rifle Championship
NCAA Rifle Championships
2013 in shooting sports
NCAA Rifle Championships